In mathematics, the integral test for convergence is a method used to test infinite series of monotonous terms for convergence. It was developed by Colin Maclaurin and Augustin-Louis Cauchy and is sometimes known as the Maclaurin–Cauchy test.

Statement of the test
Consider an integer  and a function  defined on the unbounded interval , on which it is monotone decreasing. Then the infinite series

converges to a real number if and only if the improper integral

is finite. In particular, if the integral diverges, then the series diverges as well.

Remark
If the improper integral is finite, then the proof also gives the lower and upper bounds

for the infinite series.

Note that if the function  is increasing, then the function  is decreasing and the above theorem applies.

Proof

The monotonous function  is continuous almost everywhere. To show this, let . For every , there exists by the density of  a  so that . We can uniquely identify  as the rational number that has the least index in an enumeration  and satisfies the above property. Since  is monotone, this defines an injective mapping  and thus  is countable. It follows that  is continuous almost everywhere. This is sufficient for Riemann integrability.

Since  is a monotone decreasing function, we know that

and

Hence, for every integer ,

and, for every integer ,

and from 

Combining these two estimates yields

Applications
The harmonic series

diverges because, using the natural logarithm, its antiderivative, and the fundamental theorem of calculus, we get

On the other hand, the series

(cf. Riemann zeta function)
converges for every , because by the power rule

From we get the upper estimate

which can be compared with some of the particular values of Riemann zeta function.

Borderline between divergence and convergence

for every , and whether the corresponding series of the  still diverges. In this way it is possible to investigate the borderline between divergence and convergence of infinite series.

Using the integral test for convergence, one can show (see below) that, for every natural number , the series

still diverges (cf. proof that the sum of the reciprocals of the primes diverges for ) but

converges for every . Here  denotes the -fold composition of the natural logarithm defined recursively by

using tetration or Knuth's up-arrow notation.

To see the divergence of the series using the integral test, note that by repeated application of the chain rule

hence

To see the convergence of the series, note that by the power rule, the chain rule and the above result

hence

See also
Convergence tests
Convergence (mathematics)
Direct comparison test
Dominated convergence theorem
Euler-Maclaurin formula
Limit comparison test
Monotone convergence theorem

References
 Knopp, Konrad, "Infinite Sequences and Series", Dover Publications, Inc.,  New York, 1956. (§ 3.3) 
 Whittaker, E. T., and Watson, G. N., A Course in Modern Analysis, fourth edition, Cambridge University Press, 1963. (§ 4.43) 
 Ferreira, Jaime Campos, Ed Calouste Gulbenkian, 1987,  

Augustin-Louis Cauchy
Integral calculus
Convergence tests
Articles containing proofs